Paratrek was an American aircraft manufacturer based in Auburn, California. The company specialized in the design and manufacture of powered parachutes in the form of kits for amateur construction.

In the 1990s, the company produced the Angel line of powered parachutes, including the Angel 1, Angel 2-B, Angel 3 and Angel 4, with all carriages built from a combination of bolted aluminium and 4130 steel tubing.

Aircraft

References

Defunct aircraft manufacturers of the United States
Ultralight aircraft
Homebuilt aircraft
Powered parachutes